Kenneth J. Kludt (born January 13, 1949) was an American politician and lawyer.

Kludt lived in Moorhead, Minnesota with his wife and family. He received his bachelor's degree in English from University of North Dakota and his Juris Doctor degree from Hamline University School of Law. Kludt was admitted to the Minnesota bar. Kludt served in the Minnesota House of Representatives in 1987 and 1988 and was a Democrat.

References

1949 births
Living people
People from Moorhead, Minnesota
University of North Dakota alumni
Hamline University School of Law alumni
Minnesota lawyers
Democratic Party members of the Minnesota House of Representatives